These are the official results of the Men's 3000 metres Steeplechase event at the 1996 Summer Olympics in Atlanta, Georgia. There were a total number of 35 participating athletes, with two semi-finals and three qualifying heats.

Perhaps after watching the slow start four years earlier, this time Kenyans wanted less drama than their casual sweep of 1992.  From the gun, Joseph Keter took the lead.  Moses Kiptanui got a poorer start but simply ran around the outside of the pack and joined Keter from barely 150 metres into the race and that was it.  The two never relinquished the lead.  Defending champion Matthew Birir made it a touch more dramatic by being last off the line and took all of an additional 50 metres to join the pack at the front.  The closest trailing athletes were the two Italians Angelo Carosi and Alessandro Lambruschini and Moroccan Brahim Boulami.  With three laps to go, Alessandro Lambruschini passed Boulami and Carosi to become the only one to challenge the 10 metre lead the Kenyans had built.  Little by little over the next lap, Lambruschini was able to bridge the gap, with Mark Croghan running hard from a few places back to get up to fifth.  With two laps to go, Birir started to lose contact with his teammates.  Lambruschini passed him and set off in chase of the other two.  With just over a lap to go, Keter looked over his shoulder to see who was behind him, it wasn't Birir, all three accelerated.  With Kiptanui leading Keter and Lambruschini, the group left Birir and the rest of the field behind.  Just before the water jump Keter went wide as both Kenyans hurdled the water.  Lambruschini lost a few meters and Keter was sprinting around Kiptanui.  Both men sprinted to the final barrier, with Keter taking it first and fastest.  He pulled away to victory.  10 metres later Lambruschini crossed the line with a bronze medal reward for improving over finishing fourth the previous two Olympics.  25 metres back, Birir held off the rest of the field.

Medalists

Records
These were the standing world and Olympic records (in minutes) prior to the 1996 Summer Olympics.

Final

Semifinals

Heats

See also
 1995 Men's World Championships 3000 m steeplechase
 1997 Men's World Championships 3000 m steeplechase

References

External links
 Official Report
 Results

S
Steeplechase at the Olympics
Men's events at the 1996 Summer Olympics